Łanięta may refer to the following places:
Łanięta, Kuyavian-Pomeranian Voivodeship (north-central Poland)
Łanięta, Łódź Voivodeship (central Poland)
Łanięta, Masovian Voivodeship (east-central Poland)